The 2021 PBA season was the 46th season of the Philippine Basketball Association. Due to the COVID-19 pandemic, the season's start, originally scheduled on April 11, 2021, has been delayed until July 16, 2021. The league's Board of Governors announced that the season had two conferences: the Philippine Cup and the Governors' Cup.

The first activity of the season was the PBA Season 46 draft held on March 14, 2021.

Executive board
 Commissioner: Willie Marcial
 Chairman: Ricky Vargas (Representing TNT Tropang Giga)
 Vice-Chairman: Demosthenes Rosales (Representing Terrafirma Dyip)
 Treasurer: Richard Bachmann (Representing Alaska Aces)

Teams

Player quotas

Filipino-foreigners
The PBA allows for each team to have up to five players classified as "Filipino-foreigners" in their roster. Filipino-foreigners are natural-born Filipinos who are born outside the Philippines. Natural-born Filipinos born inside the Philippines are not classified as such, and a team can as many of them as roster size permits.

Imports
Naturalized Filipinos and foreigners can play as imports. They can only play in import-laced conferences, and usually a team is mandated to have at least one for the duration of the tournament.

A list of imports was provided on those conferences' articles.

Arenas

Due to the COVID-19 pandemic in Metro Manila, the season started to be played at Ynares Sports Arena in Pasig, in a closed-circuit format, with no spectators allowed for the meantime. On August 6, Metro Manila (of which Pasig is included) was placed under enhanced community quarantine, the highest level of quarantine; the league originally planned to continue at Lipa, Batangas. The Inter-Agency Task Force for the Management of Emerging Infectious Diseases (IATF-EID) allowed the PBA to resume in places which were under either modified general community quarantine (MGCQ) or regular general community quarantine (GCQ); with the placement of Batangas under GCQ with heightened restrictions, this removed it from the places the league can play at. The PBA settled in their choice to play in Pampanga for the meantime, as they don't see the quarantine classification in Metro Manila from going to regular GCQ. The PBA then got permission to play in the Don Honorio Ventura State University gym in Bacolor.

For the first two weeks of the 2021 PBA Governors' Cup, the league returned to the Ynares Sports Arena. Quezon City then gave the permission for sports events to be held there with spectators; the PBA was expected to play at the Araneta Coliseum for the rest of the year starting December 15. At the start of 2022, the PBA was also expected to return at the Mall of Asia Arena. However, with the rise of COVID-19 cases in Metro Manila, the IATF-EID placed Metro Manila under alert level 3, causing the league to postpone the games for the week starting January 3.

When the Governors' Cup resumed on February 11, the league announced that the games would be played at the Ynares Center in Antipolo for the duration of the 2023 FIBA Basketball World Cup qualification round to be played from February 24 to 28 at the Smart Araneta Coliseum.

The league began playing at Mall of Asia Arena on March 23 during the Governors' Cup semifinals.

Transactions

Retirement
 On January 24, Cyrus Baguio announced his retirement. Baguio played for 6 franchises in his 17 seasons in the association.
 On February 1, Harvey Carey announced his retirement. Carey played for TNT Tropang Giga for 17 seasons.
 On March 21, JC Intal announced his retirement. Intal played for 4 franchises in his 13 seasons in the association.
 On May 15, Jay-R Reyes announced his retirement. Reyes played for 8 franchises in his 14 seasons in the association.
 On May 25, Marc Pingris announced his retirement. Pingris played for 3 franchises in his 15 seasons in the association.
 On December 29, Garvo Lanete announced his retirement. Lanete played for 3 franchises in his 6 seasons in the association.

Coaching changes

Notable events

Pre-season
The PBA Board of Governors approved a two-conference format this season. One All-Filipino tournament (Philippine Cup) to be held for four months and one import-laced tournament (Governors' Cup) to be held for six months.
On March 12, Ricky Vargas of TNT KaTropa was re-elected for a fourth consecutive term as the Chairman of the PBA Board of Governors. Bobby Rosales of Terrafirma Dyip was re-elected as Vice Chairman, while Richard "Dickie" Bachmann of the Alaska Aces was elected as treasurer. Bachmann was also appointed as the chairman of the PBA 3×3 tournament. Vargas became the longest-serving head of the PBA Board of Governors since the presidency of Ginebra San Miguel's Carlos "Honeyboy" Palanca III (1983 to 1986) and the chairmanship of Formula Shell's Reynaldo Marquez (1987 to 1990).
July 9: The Inter-Agency Task Force for the Management of Emerging Infectious Diseases (IATF-EID) have approved the proposal from the league to open its 46th season on July 16. The announcement came from the monthly Games and Amusements Board press conference.

Philippine Cup
July 18: Barangay Ginebra San Miguel started wearing their "Bagong Tapang" jerseys. The jerseys replace their light uniforms. The said jerseys were launched in April and were made available to fans  beginning on May 1.
July 21: Four games involving the TNT Tropang Giga and the Terrafirma Dyip were postponed due to TNT players' inconclusive COVID-19 test results.
August 3: The league suspended their games beginning August 4 after the government declared that Metro Manila was under Enhanced Community Quarantine from August 6 to 20. The league have appealed to the Inter-Agency Task Force for the Management of Emerging Infectious Diseases (IATF-EID) if they can continue their tournament in Batangas, which was under a more relaxed quarantine restrictions.
August 23: The league announced that they got the approval of Pampanga governor Dennis Pineda to resume their games at the Don Honorio Ventura State University in Bacolor starting September 1.

Midseason break
The league announced that the inaugural 3x3 season would start on November 20.
November 9: The PBA board of governors have approved to revise the league's policy for Fil-foreigner to be eligible for the PBA draft. Fil-foreigners are only required to submit a Philippine passport upon application to the draft. The board also increased the number of Fil-foreigner players per team from five to seven.

Governors' Cup

December 10: The Quezon City government approved the PBA's request to play their games with spectators. The games were played at the Smart Araneta Coliseum with half capacity allowed starting December 15.
December 25: The Magnolia Hotshots retired the jersey numbers of PJ Simon (#8) and Marc Pingris (#15), during halftime of their game against Barangay Ginebra San Miguel.
January 3, 2022: The league postpones its scheduled games for the first week of January after Metro Manila was put on Alert Level 3 due to the rising COVID-19 cases.
January 6: The league postpones the Governors' Cup indefinitely. Team scrimmages are also suspended.
January 30: The league announced that the Governors' Cup would resume on February 11. Subsequently, the league announced on February 12 that spectators were allowed to watch the games inside the playing venues beginning February 16.
February 16: Alaska Aces team owner Wilfred Uytengsu announced that the franchise was leaving the PBA at the end of the 2021 season.
February 18: The PBA announced that the Hong Kong-based Bay Area Chun Yu Phoenixes from EASL would enter the league as a guest team during the Governors' Cup of season 47. Their participation was formally announced on March 21. It was also announced that the team would compete under the name Bay Area Dragons, so as not to confuse their nickname with current PBA team Phoenix Super LPG.
February 28: After the IATF-EID announced that Metro Manila would be under Alert Level 1 from March 1 to 15, the league announced that the Smart Araneta Coliseum would be back to full capacity starting on March 2.
March 6: The Alaska Aces retired the jersey number of Sonny Thoss (#7), during halftime of their game against Magnolia Hotshots.
March 19: The Alaska Aces played its final PBA game after being eliminated by the NLEX Road Warriors in their do-or-die quarterfinal game, 96–80. At the end of the game, the league held a short tribute to the Alaska franchise then Commissioner Willie Marcial sounded the ceremonial "final buzzer" at center court.
March 23: The PBA Board of Governors unanimously approved the sale of the Alaska franchise to Converge ICT Solutions Inc. Former PBA commissioner Chito Salud became its team governor.
April 20: A fire broke out at the construction area beside the Smart Araneta Coliseum at around 11:00 am while the games of the 2021 PBA 3x3 second conference grand finals was underway. The 3x3 games were postponed and subsequently, Game 6 of the Governors' Cup finals between Barangay Ginebra and Meralco were rescheduled to April 22.

Opening ceremonies
The opening ceremony for this season was held at the Ynares Sports Arena in Pasig on July 16, 2021. Due to COVID-19 related restrictions, the traditional parade of teams with muses was not done and a “simple” opening ceremonies were held instead.

The first game of the Philippine Cup between the Alaska Aces and the Blackwater Bossing was played after the opening ceremonies.

Philippine Cup
The Philippine Cup started on July 16, was suspended on August 3, restarted on September 1, and ended on October 29, 2021.

Elimination round

Playoffs

Quarterfinals

|}

|}*Team has twice-to-beat advantage. Team 1 only has to win once, while Team 2 has to win twice.

Semifinals

|}

Finals

|}
 Finals MVP: Mikey Williams

Governors' Cup

The Governors' Cup started on December 6, 2021, was suspended on January 5, 2022, restarted on February 11, and ended on April 22.

Elimination round

Playoffs

Quarterfinals

|}*Team has twice-to-beat advantage. Team 1 only has to win once, while Team 2 has to win twice.

Semifinals

|}

Finals

|}
 Finals MVP: Scottie Thompson

Awards

Leo Awards

 Most Valuable Player: Scottie Thompson (Barangay Ginebra)
 Rookie of the Year: Mikey Williams (TNT)
 Most Improved Player: Juami Tiongson (Terrafirma)
 First Mythical Team:
 Mikey Williams (TNT)
 Scottie Thompson (Barangay Ginebra)
 June Mar Fajardo (San Miguel)
 Calvin Abueva (Magnolia)
 Arwind Santos (NorthPort)
 Second Mythical Team:
 Robert Bolick (NorthPort)
 CJ Perez (San Miguel)
 Ian Sangalang (Magnolia)
 Christian Standhardinger (Barangay Ginebra)
 Matthew Wright (Phoenix)
 All-Defensive Team:
 Jio Jalalon (Magnolia)
 Chris Ross (San Miguel)
 Kelly Williams (TNT)
 Cliff Hodge (Meralco)
 Arwind Santos (NorthPort)
 Samboy Lim Sportsmanship Award: Kevin Alas (NLEX)

PBA Press Corps Annual Awards
 Defensive Player of the Year: Arwind Santos (NorthPort)
 Scoring Champion: Mikey Williams (TNT)
 Baby Dalupan Coach of the Year: Chot Reyes (TNT)
 Mr. Quality Minutes: Allein Maliksi (Meralco)
 Danny Floro Executive of the Year: Alfrancis Chua (Barangay Ginebra) 
 Order of Merit: 
 Mikey Williams (TNT)
 Robert Bolick (NorthPort)
 Ian Sangalang (Magnolia)
 Matthew Wright (Phoenix)
All-Rookie Team
 Mikey Williams (TNT)
 Joshua Munzon (Terrafrima)
 Leonard Santillan (Rain or Shine)
 Calvin Oftana (NLEX)
 Jamie Malonzo (NorthPort)
 Game of the Season: San Miguel vs. NorthPort (December 12, 2021, Governors' Cup eliminations)

Cumulative standings

Elimination round

Playoffs
This includes one-game playoffs to determine the last playoff participant.

3x3

The 3x3 season started on November 20, 2021, and ended on July 3, 2022. The final legs of the third conference were held in concurrence with the Philippine Cup of the succeeding PBA season.

Notes

References

External links
 PBA Official Website

 
 
Basketball events curtailed due to the COVID-19 pandemic